Sushma Swaraj was the Indian External Affairs Minister under Prime Minister Narendra Modi from May 2014 till May 2019, responsible for implementing the foreign policy of Narendra Modi. She is only the second women to hold this position after Indira Gandhi

Background
Swaraj was a lawyer by profession and a seasoned parliamentarian with many 'first-timer' records in her name, often considered to be among the best spoken Indian politician and also known for her diplomatic skills.
She served as the Leader of the Opposition in the 15th Lok Sabha from 2009 to 2014 and by virtue of her designation she had the opportunity to meet a galaxy of world leaders visiting India apart from her official foreign trips. This has significantly improved her understanding in world affairs and also helped her to develop a personal rapport with many important dignitaries.

Policy initiatives

Fast-track Diplomacy
On completion of the first 100 days of Modi govt the External Affairs Ministry published a booklet called "Fast Track Diplomacy" show-casing the achievement made in the foreign policy arena. In her first media interaction, the minister Sushma Swaraj said the catchphrase for her tenure was "fast-track diplomacy" and said it had three faces – proactive, strong and sensitive. Since taking office, the External Affairs Minister held round-table meeting with all Indian heads of missions to the SAARC region, ASEAN region and Middle East separately as a follow up measure to carry forward the leads gained by high-profile visits and exchanges.

Act East Policy
From the very beginning, the NDA Government made it ample clear that India would focus more and more on improving relation with ASEAN and other East Asian countries as per India's Look East policy which was formulated during Narasimha Rao's Government in 1992 for better economic engagement with its eastern neighbours but successive Governments later successfully turned it into a tool for forging strategic partnership and security cooperation with countries in that region in general and Vietnam and Japan in particular. In her recent visit to Hanoi, Vietnam, Sushma Swaraj has stressed on the need for an Act East Policy that she said should replace India's over two decade-old Look East Policy emphasizing a more proactive role for India in this region.

Multilateral engagements

ASEAN Regional Forum
Swaraj attended the 2014 ASEAN Regional Forum followed by the related EAS Foreign Ministers meeting, held from 8–11 August in Naypidaw, Myanmar, which was her first ever appearance in multilateral forums after becoming India's foreign affairs head. She had held bilateral meetings with her counterparts from seven countries including China, Australia, Canada, Vietnam, Philippines, Brunei and Indonesia.

Foreign trips made as External Affairs Minister
The following is a list of international visits made by Swaraj after taking office as External Affairs Minister on 26 May 2014.

2014

2015

2016

See also
 Foreign policy of Narendra Modi
 Minister of External Affairs (India)
 Hillary Clinton's tenure as Secretary of State

References

Foreign relations of India
Foreign policy of the Narendra Modi administration